Roseville is a city in Ramsey County, Minnesota, United States. It is one of two Twin Cities suburbs that are adjacent to both Saint Paul and Minneapolis (the other is Lauderdale). The land comprising Falcon Heights, Lauderdale, and southern Roseville was unincorporated until Roseville incorporated in 1948 and Falcon Heights and Lauderdale incorporated in 1949. The population was 36,254 at the 2020 census.

History
Roseville's land was originally settled by the Dakota and Ojibwe peoples. The first white settlers came in 1843, and the Native Americans left the area by 1862. Rose Township was established in 1858; it was named after one of the first settlers, Isaac Rose.  The township included the areas now known as Roseville, Lauderdale, and Falcon Heights, as well as parts of present-day Saint Paul and Minneapolis.  The area saw rapid growth through the 1930s and 1940s, and Roseville incorporated as a village in 1948 to accommodate it.  Falcon Heights and Lauderdale soon followed suit, and Rose Township ceased to exist.  The first Roseville Police Chief was Ray Goneau and he held that position until 1977.

Geography

The 45th parallel crosses the city; a marker at the northeast corner of the intersection of Cleveland Avenue and Loren Road identifies the location.

Interstate Highway 35W and Minnesota Highways 36, 51 (Snelling Avenue), and 280 are the four main routes in Roseville.

Demographics

2010 census
As of the census of 2010, there were 33,660 people, 14,623 households, and 8,406 families living in the city. The racial makeup of the city was 81.3% White, 6.2% African American, 0.5% Native American, 7.3% Asian American, 2.0% from other races, and 2.7% from two or more races. Hispanic or Latino of any race were 4.6% of the population.

There were 14,623 households, of which 23.2% had children under the age of 18 living with them, 46.0% were married couples living together, 8.4% had a female householder with no husband present, 3.1% had a male householder with no wife present, and 42.5% were non-families. 35.3% of all households were made up of individuals, and 15.4% had someone living alone who was 65 years of age or older. The average household size was 2.20 and the average family size was 2.87.

The median age in the city was 42.1 years. 18.6% of residents were under the age of 18; 10.8% were between the ages of 18 and 24; 23.7% were from 25 to 44; 26.6% were from 45 to 64; and 20.2% were 65 years of age or older. The gender makeup of the city was 47.1% male and 52.9% female.

2000 census
As of the census of 2000, there were 33,690 people, 14,598 households, and 8,598 families living in the city. The racial makeup of the city was 89.49% White, 2.80% Black, 0.32% Native American, 4.89% Asian, 0.08% Pacific Islander, 0.76% from other races, and 1.65% from two or more races. Hispanic or Latino of any race were 1.97% of the population.

There were 14,598 households, out of which 22.2% had children under the age of 18 living with them, 49.2% were married couples living together, 7.2% had a female householder with no husband present, and 41.1% were non-families. 33.6% of all households were made up of individuals, and 13.9% had someone living alone who was 65 years of age or older. The average household size was 2.20 and the average family size was 2.82.

18.2% of residents were under the age of 18, 11.1% were between 18 and 24, 26.8% were between 25 and 44, 23.6% were between 45 and 64, and 20.3% were 65 years of age or older. The median age was 41 years. For every 100 females, there were 87.0 males. For every 100 females age 18 and over, there were 84.1 males.

The median income for a household in the city was $51,056, and the median income for a family was $65,861. (These figures had risen to $51,617 and $81,300, respectively, as of 2008.) Males had a median income of $41,765, and females had a median income of $32,389. The per capita income for the city was $27,755. About 2.6% of families and 4.2% of the population were below the poverty line, including 4.5% of those under age 18 and 2.9% of those age 65 or over.

Economy

Roseville's property taxes are some of the lowest in the Twin Cities metropolitan area, owing in part to the extensive commercially zoned land. Several major shopping centers are in Roseville, including Rosedale Center and the Har Mar Mall. The city's per-capita retail spending is slightly higher than that of Bloomington (home of the Mall of America), and it has the greatest number of restaurants per capita in the area.

The first Target store was built on May 3, 1962 in Roseville and replaced in 2005 with a SuperTarget. Roseville was home to the first Barnes & Noble bookstore outside New York City. This location was closed in 2005; the current Barnes & Noble in Roseville is the chain's second store in Roseville. The first McDonald's in the state of Minnesota was built in Roseville in 1957. The Roseville Dairy Queen, also first in the state, is currently on the Preservation Alliance of Minnesota's list of the 10 Most Endangered Historic Places.

The credit scoring and data analytics firm FICO has one of its main Midwest U.S. office locations in Roseville.

The Minnesota Department of Education has its headquarters in Roseville, as does the Minnesota Department of Transportation-Metropolitan District.

The fifth-largest board game publisher in the world, Fantasy Flight Games, is based in Roseville. Roseville Visitors Association, the Official Visitors Site for Roseville, Old Dutch Foods, the Minnesota Department of Education, and the Minnesota State Lottery are headquartered in Roseville.

From 1961 to 2017, UNIVAC designed and manufactured mainframe computers at a plant in Roseville.

Arts and culture
Roseville Library (at Hamline Avenue and County Road B) is Minnesota's busiest library. It is the largest location in the Ramsey County Library system, with over 340,000 volumes in its collection, nearly three times that of any other branch in the county. It was rebuilt in 1993, then torn down and rebuilt again with larger capacity in 2010. Only the downtown Saint Paul library, with around 400,000 volumes, has more materials.

Sports
Roseville is also home to the John Rose Oval, North America's largest outdoor artificial sheet of ice. The 1995 Men's Bandy World Championship, 2006 Women's Bandy World Championship and the 2016 Women's Bandy World Championship were played there. The United States national bandy team and its Canadian counterpart usually play friendly games there against each other in November.

Parks and recreation

Notable parks and recreation areas include Reservoir Woods Park, Guidant John Rose Minnesota Oval, and Bennett Lake in Central Park. At 225 acres, Central Park is the largest park in Roseville, and one of the larger urban parks in Ramsey County.

Education

Primary and secondary
Roseville is served by the Roseville Area Schools District (ISD 623).

Roseville elementary schools include Brimhall Elementary, Central Park Elementary, Emmett D. Williams Elementary, Edgerton Elementary, Falcon Heights Elementary, Little Canada Elementary, and Parkview Center School (K–8).

Roseville Area Middle School (RAMS) serves grades 7 and 8. Roseville Area High School (RAHS) serves grades 9 through 12. Richard Dean Anderson graduated from Ramsey High School, which, along with Kellogg High School, became RAHS. Fairview Alternative High School is also located in the area.

Roseville is home to two Lutheran schools: Concordia Academy, a high school, and King of Kings Lutheran Church and School, a preschool-8th grade institution. Both are affiliated with the Lutheran Church–Missouri Synod.

St. Rose of Lima is a private (pre–K through 8) Catholic school.

Higher education
 National American University
 University of Northwestern – Saint Paul

Notable people
Joey Anderson, NHL player
Loni Anderson, actor, WKRP in Cincinnati
Richard Dean Anderson, actor, MacGyver and Stargate SG-1
Robert Bell, Minnesota state legislator
Billy Graham, president of University of Northwestern – Saint Paul (1948-1952), founder radio station KTIS (AM) (1949)
David Frederickson, commissioner of the Minnesota Department of Agriculture
Jim Kramer, 2006 North American Scrabble champion
Peter Krause, actor, Sports Night, Six Feet Under, Dirty Sexy Money, Parenthood and 9-1-1
Mike Muscala, NBA player

References

External links

 Roseville, MN – Official Website
 Roseville Visitors Association – VisitRoseville.com

 
Cities in Minnesota
Cities in Ramsey County, Minnesota